The Cow Who Wanted to Be a Hamburger is an American independent short film directed by Bill Plympton. It was screened first at the Annecy Film Festival and after a running at numerous other festival was nominated for Best Short Film at the 38th Annie Awards.

Production
Director Bill Plympton said the film "was made almost by accident".

Awards
The Cow Who Wanted to Be a Hamburger was screened in the official selection of the Annecy Film Festival, being nominated for best short film. It is one of the five nominated short animated films at the 38th Annie Awards and one of the six nominated short animated films at Oaxaca Film Fest. Also, it is one of the ten pre-selected short animated films for the 2011 Academy Awards.

Preservation
The Academy Film Archive preserved The Cow Who Wanted to Be a Hamburger in 2016.

References

External links
 
 The Cow Who Wanted to Be a Hamburger at Filmaffinity

2010s American animated films
2010s animated short films
2010 films
2010 animated films
American animated short films
Films directed by Bill Plympton
Films about cattle
2010s English-language films